Villa's gray shrew (Notiosorex villai) is a shrew native to northeastern Mexico, where it is called musaraña.

It is assessed vulnerable by the IUCN due to its small extent of occurrence and degradation of habitat.

Taxonomy 
The shrew was formerly considered to be a part of N. crawfordi, but is now considered a distinct species.

Distribution and habitat 
Currently it is known to occur in only three locations in two isolated mountain valleys. It is known to inhabit pine-oak forest, tropical forest and riparian forest. The species may have a larger extent of occurrence than is currently known.

Conservation 
The species has been assessed as vulnerable by the IUCN Red List. Threats to the species include its small extent of habitats, habitat degradation, overgrazing, and agricultural activities.

Th species probably inhabits the western part of the El Cielo Biosphere Reserve in Tamaulipas, Mexico.

References

External links 
 Information about Notiosorex villa

Notiosorex
Mammals described in 2000
Taxobox binomials not recognized by IUCN